The Lourde is a stream in the Dordogne department of southwestern France. It is a tributary of the Auvézère river. The river begins on the border of the communes of Teillots and Badefols-d'Ans. It passes Hautefort and empties into the Auvézère in its left bank in Cherveix-Cubas, northwest of the hamlet of Saint-Martial-Laborie.

References

Rivers of France
Rivers of Nouvelle-Aquitaine
Rivers of Dordogne